T4 was a scheduling slot on Channel 4 (T4 Saturday usually 9 am until 2 pm) and E4 (T4 Sunday usually 9 am until 5 pm). It also aired on weekdays in the school holidays. The slot had a separate station identification on screen graphic from Channel 4 and E4. Channel 4 originally produced the strand in-house until 2002, when production was passed onto independent companies. The slot was targeted at the 16-24 age group.

Until 25 March 2012, T4 aired on Channel 4 both Saturday and Sunday. To make way for the introduction of Sunday Brunch in March 2012, T4 Sunday was later moved to run on E4. T4 Saturday remained on Channel 4 and some programmes that previously appeared within the T4 block, such as The Simpsons, remained on Channel 4 on Sunday afternoons.

On 12 October 2012, Channel 4 announced that it would be axing T4 at the end of December 2012. The show ended on 29 December 2012.

Early history
Early on in T4s run, programmes aimed at children often aired in addition to the content aimed at older viewers, with shows such as CatDog and 2 Stupid Dogs appearing in the early schedule of the strand. Around 2001, this was dropped and the strand refocused entirely towards the teen/youth market. For the first few months of T4s life, its idents consisted of an animated spaceman like character. In 1999, this character instead appeared on the idents during the early morning pre-school shows, in addition to the weekend children's programmes that fell outside the T4 strand. These idents continued in use until 2004.

T4 on E4, 2001
After E4's launch in 2001, T4 initially also had a slot on the channel, however this was short lived. It also had an equally short lived Friday evening slot on Channel 4. Following the sale of Quiz Call by Channel 4, it was rumoured that a T4 channel was one of the proposals to fill the vacant slot on Freeview (and subsequently on satellite and cable). However, the plan is also thought to have been rejected by director of television Kevin Lygo, as the slot was filled by Film4 +1 (now replaced, in turn, by Channel 4 +1).

Later years
Initially broadcast only on Sundays, the success of T4 saw the strand subsequently extended to include a Saturday block.

In more recent years, T4 had provided Channel 4 a broadcast window of programmes that are also broadcast in primetime slots on E4, such as The Big Bang Theory. In addition, following Channel 4's acquisition of terrestrial broadcast rights to The Simpsons, the series began to feature regularly within T4. Friends featured regularly within T4 until Channel 4 relinquished the rights to the sitcom in 2011.

Vernon Kay, Dermot O'Leary, Miquita Oliver and Alexa Chung returned for the last show on 29 December 2012 alongside current presenters Matt Edmondson, Nick Grimshaw, Jameela Jamil, Georgie Okell and Will Best.

T4 on the Beach

T4 also staged an annual summer concert, T4 on the Beach, in the resort of Weston-super-Mare (for its first two years in 2003 and 2004, it was held in Great Yarmouth under the name Pop Beach), and previous musical acts that have appeared include McFly, Calvin Harris, Little Boots, and The Zutons. The concert in July 2010 was the sixth year running that the event had taken place in Weston-super-Mare which featured Dizzee Rascal and Florence and the Machine, among others. After the strand's cancellation, there was going to be a replacement titled Summer Sets on the Beach which would air live on ITV2 on 31 August 2013, but it was axed due to a lack of ticket sales.

T4 Stars Of...
Normally bookended at the tail end of the year, the T4 Stars Of... concert was broadcast live from Earls Court. The event was first held in 2009 and since then had become an annual fixture in the T4 events calendar. The Stars Of... title usually preceded the year in which it was being held e.g. Stars of 2010, as it was widely regarded as the replacement show for the now defunct Smash Hits Poll Winners Party that T4 broadcast from 2001 to 2005.

2009 line-up
Kasabian
JLS
Sugababes
La Roux
Calvin Harris
N-Dubz
Alexandra Burke
Florence and the Machine
Example
Ke$ha
Paloma Faith
The Saturdays
Chipmunk
Tinchy Stryder

2010 line-up
Alexandra Burke
Tinie Tempah
Pixie Lott
Professor Green
Example
Ellie Goulding
N-Dubz
Olly Murs
JLS
The Wanted
Mark Ronson
Jason Derulo
The Saturdays
Roll Deep
Devlin

2011 line-up
Labrinth
Matt Cardle
Emeli Sandé
Cher Lloyd
Rizzle Kicks
Tinchy Stryder
Dappy
Example
Pixie Lott
Ed Sheeran
Wretch 32
The Wanted
Professor Green
DJ Fresh

Presenters

Programming
90210 (2009–2012)
Age of Love (2007)
The Album Chart Show (2006–2012)
Andromeda (2000–2005)
Angel (2000–2001)
Angela Anaconda (2001–2003)
As If (2001–2004)
Average Joe (2003–2005)
Being... N-Dubz (2010–2011)
Beauty and The Geek – Both the British and American versions have aired (2006–2008)
The Big Bang Theory (2008–2012)
Big Brother (2000–2010)
Big Brother's Little Brother - (2001–2010)
Biker Mice from Mars (1998–1999)
Celebrity Big Brother – (2001–2010)
Celebrity Predictions (2005–2007)
Charlie's Angels (2011)
Charmed (Season Eight only) (2006-2007)
City Guys (2000–2001)
Clone High (2003)
Coach Trip – (2005–2006)
The Crush (2010–2011)
Dawson's Creek (1998–2001)
Desperate Housewives (2006)
Dirty Sexy Things (2011)
Entourage (2006–2012)
Family Guy (2000–2005)
Frasier (1998–2004)
Friends (1998–2011)
Frock Me (2008–2010)
Futurama (2004–2006)
Girls Aloud: Off The Record (2006)
Glee (2010–2011)
Great British Hairdresser (2011)
The Hills (2006–2010)
Hollyoaks – Extreme Challenge (2006)
The Hollyoaks Music Show (2008–2011)
Hollyoaks Omnibus (1998–2012)
Hollyoaks on the Pull (2000)
Hollyoaks: Summer's Got a Secret (2008)
Joe Millionaire (2003–2005)
Johnny Bravo (1999–2003)
King of the Hill (1998–2010)
KoKo Pop (2010–2012)
Made in Chelsea (2011–2012)
Malibu, CA (2000–2003)
Master of the Musicverse – (2007)
Model Behaviour (2001–2002)
Musicool (2007)
My Big Fat Obnoxious Boss (2004)
New Girl (season 1 only) (2012)
New Look's Style the Nation (2011)
The O.C. (2004–2007)
One Tree Hill (2004–2012)
That Paralympic Show (2010)
Party in the Park (1998–2004)
Perfect Couples (2011)
Popworld – (2001–2007)
Princess Nikki (2006)
Pussycat Dolls Present: The Search for the Next Doll (2007)
Pussycat Dolls Present: Girlicious (2008)
Rachel Stevens: My World (2005)
Reaper (2008–2009)
Relentless (2005–2006)
Renford Rejects (1999–2001)
Rock School (2005–2006)
Rules of Engagement (2008–2012)
The Saturdays: What Goes On Tour (2011)
Scrubs (2002–2010)
Sesame Street (1998–1999)
Shipwrecked (1999–2012)
The Simpsons (2004–2012)
Sister, Sister (2002–2004)
Smallville (2002–2011)
The Sopranos (2000–2007)
Stargate SG-1 (1998–2007)
Star Trek: Enterprise (2002–2005)
Summer Daze with Blackberry (2012)
Suburgatory (season 1 only) (2012)
T4 Honours (2005)
T4 MobileAct Unsigned (2008–2009)
T4 Movie Special (2004–2012)
T4 On the Beach, 4Music On the Beach, Postcard from T4 On the Beach and various other spin-off shows (2003–2012)
T4 'Stars of...' and various other spin-off shows (2009)
T4: Sugababes Special (2006)
Totally Frank (2005–2006)
Totally Spies! (2002-2004)
Transmission With T-Mobile (2006–2009)
Ugly Betty (2007–2010)
Ultimate Traveller (2010)
Vanity Lair (2008)
The West Wing (2000–2006)
When Women Rule the World (2008)
Will & Grace (1999–2006)
The World's Greatest Popstars (2009)
WWF Heat (1999–2002)
Your Face or Mine? (2002–2003)

Executive staff
T4's executives were Henrietta Conrad (executive producer) and Sebastian Grant (series producer) for Princess Productions, and Cath Lovesey (series editor) and Sangeeta Bhaskar (Channel 4 executive) for Channel 4.

References

External links
Gallery of the T4 celebrity guests
Picture gallery of all the T4 Presenters
T4 on the Beach Tickets
Photos of T4 on the Beach 2006 in Weston-super-Mare
Review of T4 on the Beach 2006 in Weston-super-Mare
 

1998 British television series debuts
2012 British television series endings
1998 establishments in the United Kingdom
2012 disestablishments in the United Kingdom
Channel 4
Television series by Endemol
Television series by Warner Bros. Television Studios
Television programming blocks in Europe